Chula is an unincorporated community in Tift County, Georgia, United States. Chula has a post office with ZIP code 31733.

History
An early variant name was "Ruby". The Georgia General Assembly incorporated the place in 1904 as the "Town of Chula". The town's municipal charter was repealed in 1906.

References

Former municipalities in Georgia (U.S. state)
Unincorporated communities in Tift County, Georgia
Unincorporated communities in Georgia (U.S. state)